Zeki Korkmaz (born 1 September 1988) is a Turkish footballer who plays as a midfielder for Elazığspor.

External links
 Guardian Stats Centre
 

1988 births
Sportspeople from Bingöl
Living people
Turkish footballers
Turkey youth international footballers
Turkey under-21 international footballers
Association football midfielders
Pendikspor footballers
İstanbul Başakşehir F.K. players
Elazığspor footballers
Karşıyaka S.K. footballers
Darıca Gençlerbirliği footballers
Kahramanmaraşspor footballers
Sakaryaspor footballers
Süper Lig players
TFF First League players
TFF Second League players
TFF Third League players